The rate of heat flow is the amount of heat that is transferred per unit of time in some material, usually measured in watt (joules per second). Heat  is  the  flow  of  thermal  energy  driven  by  thermal  non-equilibrium,  so  that  'heat  flow'  is  a  redundancy (i.e. a pleonasm, and the same for ‘work flow’). Heat must not be confused with stored thermal energy, and moving a hot object from one place to another must not be called heat transfer. But, in spite of all these remarks, it is common in normal parlance to say ‘heat flow’, to talk of ‘heat content’, etc.

The equation of heat flow is given by Fourier's Law of Heat Conduction.

Rate of heat flow = - (heat transfer coefficient) * (area of the body) * (variation of the temperature) / (length of the material)

The formula for the rate of heat flow is:

where

  is the net heat (energy) transfer,
  is the time taken,
  is the difference in temperature between the cold and hot sides,
  is the thickness of the material conducting heat (distance between hot and cold sides),
  is the thermal conductivity, and
  is the surface area of the surface emitting heat.

The minus sign is there because the rate of heat flow is always negative—heat flows from the side at higher temperature to the one at lower temperature, not the other way around.

See also

Heat transfer coefficient
Heat transfer
Thermal conduction
Thermal conductivity
 Heat flux
 Watt
 Flux

References

Thermodynamic properties
Heat flow